Twin Hills Golf & Country Club is a country club located in an unincorporated part of Oklahoma County that borders Forest Park and Oklahoma City, Oklahoma. The golf course hosted the PGA Championship in 1935. Johnny Revolta won the tournament beating Tommy Armour 5 and 4.

History of the course
The history of Twin Hills dates back to 1920 when five oilmen (Al Maidt, Bob Conliff, Gus Mattison, Leslie Norris, and Bill Buchholz) commissioned Perry Maxwell to design and build the course on its present 160-acre site. Soon after completing the course, these founders sold the course to the Dorset Carter family. It is believed that Dorset Carter purchased the club in 1921 for his son, Keefe Carter. Keefe was an accomplished golfer, winning the prestigious Western Open in 1925.

The official founding date of Twin Hills came in 1923. This date coincides with the date the clubhouse was completed, and the Club was officially incorporated as member-owned in 1946. Twin Hills has hosted several prestigious tournaments over the years including the Western Amateur, PGA Championship, Western Junior Open, Oklahoma City Open, U.S. Junior Amateur, NAIA National Championship and has hosted some of the world’s greatest golfers—Johnny Revolta, Arnold Palmer, Gene Sarazen, Gene Littler, and many more.

Scorecard

Tournaments hosted

 1930 Oklahoma Open
 1934 Western Amateur
 1932 Oklahoma Open
 1935 PGA Championship
 1955 Women's Trans-National
 1957 Oklahoma Open
 1959 Oklahoma City Open
 1960 Oklahoma City Open
 1961 Trans-Mississippi Amateur
 1967 U.S. Junior Amateur
 1968 National Team Championship
 1976 Oklahoma Open
 1977 Oklahoma Open

References

Golf clubs and courses in Oklahoma
Buildings and structures in Oklahoma County, Oklahoma